Silicon Forest is a nickname for the Washington County cluster of high-tech companies located in the Portland metropolitan area in the U.S. state of Oregon, and most frequently refers to the industrial corridor between Beaverton and Hillsboro in northwest Oregon.

The name is analogous to Silicon Valley. In the greater Portland area, these companies have traditionally specialized in hardware — specifically test-and-measurement equipment (Tektronix), computer chips (Intel and an array of smaller chip manufacturers), electronic displays (InFocus, Planar Systems and Pixelworks) and printers (Hewlett-Packard Co, Xerox and Epson). There is a small clean technology emphasis in the area.

History 

Silicon Forest can refer to all the technology companies in Oregon, but initially referred to Washington County on Portland’s west side. First used in a Japanese company’s press release dating to 1981, Lattice Semiconductor trademarked the term in 1984 but does not use the term in its marketing materials. Lattice’s founder is sometimes mentioned as the person who came up with the term.

The high-tech industry in the Portland area dates back to at least the 1940s, with Tektronix and Electro Scientific Industries as pioneers. Tektronix and ESI both started out in Portland proper, but moved to Washington County in 1951 and 1962, respectively, and developed sites designed to attract other high-tech companies.  Floating Point Systems, co-founded by three former Tektronix employees in Beaverton in 1970, was the first spin-off company in Silicon Forest and the third (after Tek and ESI) to be traded on the NYSE. These three companies, and later Intel, led to the creation of a number of other spin-offs and startups, some of which were remarkably successful.  A 2003 dissertation on these spin-offs led to a poster depicting the genealogy of 894 Silicon Forest companies. High-tech employment in the state reached a peak of almost 73,000 in 2001, but has never recovered from the dot-com bust. Statewide, tech employment totaled 57,000 in the spring of 2012.

Unlike other regions with a "silicon" appellation, semiconductors truly are the heart of Oregon's tech industry.

Intel's headquarters remain in Santa Clara, California, but in the 1990s the company began moving its most advanced technical operations to Oregon. Its Ronler Acres campus eventually became its most advanced anywhere, and Oregon is now Intel's largest operating hub. In late 2012, Intel had close to 17,000 employees in Oregon—more than anywhere else the company operated; by 2022, the number had grown to about 22,000.

Companies and subsidiaries 
The following is a sample of past and present notable companies in the Silicon Forest. They may have been founded in the Silicon Forest or have a major subsidiary there. A list of Portland tech startups (technology companies founded in Portland) is provided separately.

Current

Act-On
Adtran (after acquired a startup named ”SmartRG”)
Aistock
Airbnb
Amazon Web Services (via acquisition of Elemental Technologies)
Ambric (acquired by Nethra Imaging in April 2009)

Apple Inc. (Software Engineering in Vancouver, WA. This was previously the Claris products group) and a new R&D facility around Hillsboro.
Arris Group (via acquisition of C-COR)
ASML Holding
Atos

Autodesk Inc
Biotronik

Brandlive
Cambia Health Solutions (HealthSparq, Hubbub, and SpendWell)
Cascade Microtech
CD Baby
CollegeNET
Consumer Cellular
DAT Solutions
Digimarc
eBay
Electro Scientific Industries

EPSON
Expensify
Extensis
Thermo Fisher Scientific (via acquisition of FEI Company)
FLIR Systems
ForgeRock
GemStone Systems
Genentech
Google
Grass Valley
Hewlett-Packard
IBM (by acquisition of Sequent)
InFocus
Intel
Integra Telecom
IP Fabrics
IXIA
Jaguar Land Rover
Janrain
Kryptiq Corporation
Kyocera
LaCie
Laika
Lam Research (through merging with Novellus Systems)
Lattice Semiconductor
Lightspeed Systems
Linear Technology
Logitech
Maxim Integrated Products
McAfee
Mentor Graphics
Mozilla
Microchip Technology  (purchased Fujitsu old facility)
Microsoft, especially for hardware engineering design center
New Relic (Engineering Headquarters)
Nike, Inc. (Consumer Digital Division)
Nvidia Corporation
NuScale Power
OpenSesame Inc
ON Semiconductor
Oracle Corporation (by acquisition of Sun Microsystems)
Oregon Scientific
Panic Software
PacStar
Phoseon Technology
Pivotal Labs
Pixelworks
Planar Systems
Pop Art, Inc.
Puppet
Qorvo
RadiSys Corporation
Razorfish
Rentrak
RFPIO
Rivos
Rohde & Schwarz
Rockwell Collins
Sage Software (by the acquisition of Timberline)
Salesforce.com
Sensory, Inc.
Sharp Corporation
Silicon Labs
Siltronic
Simple
Shimadzu Corp.
Skyworks (by the acquisition of Avnera)
Smarsh
Sellgo
SurveyMonkey
Squarespace
Synopsys
Tektronix
Tripwire
Urban Airship
Vacasa
VeriWave
Vernier Software & Technology
Vevo
Wacom (North American Headquarters are based in Portland)
WaferTech (TSMC subsidiary)
Webtrends
WebMD
Welch Allyn
Workday, Inc
Xerox
ZoomInfo

Former

BiiN (defunct)
Central Point Software (defunct)
ClearEdge Power
Etec Systems, Inc. (acquired by Applied Materials)
Floating Point Systems (defunct)
Fujitsu (factory closed, sold to Microchip Technology)
Jive Software (acquired & closed)
MathStar (defunct)
Merix Corporation (acquired by Viasystems)
Microsoft's Surface Hub R&D (closed down)
nCUBE. Beaverton HQ was established in 1983. Acquired by C-COR in 2005, which was in turn acquired by ARRIS in 2007. CommScope acquired ARRIS in 2019, and closed the Beaverton office in the aftermath of the COVID-19 pandemic.
NEC (factory closed)
Open Source Development Labs (defunct)
Oregon Graduate Institute (merged with OHSU in 2001; Washington County campus closed in 2014)
Sequent Computer Systems (purchased by IBM in 1993)  Sequent, founded by a team that included three Intel VPs and 15 other employees, also mostly from Intel, made a major contribution to multiprocessing and was largely responsible for the demise of large minicomputers, which could be replaced by much smaller and cheaper micro-processor-based multiprocessor systems.  It went public in 1987 and was beginning to also encroach on the market for large mainframe transaction processing systems when IBM bought it out.
SolarWorld
SunPower (in former SolarWorld facility)

See also 
 List of places with "Silicon" names

References

External links 

 
 The Oregonian's Silicon Forest Blog
 Portland Tech portal at AboutUs.org
 Silicon Florist: Coverage of the web-based startup scene

Silicon Forest
High-technology business districts in the United States
Economy of Portland, Oregon
Washington County, Oregon
Information technology places
1981 in Oregon